Jennifer Dawn Boucek (born December 20, 1973) is an assistant basketball coach for the Indiana Pacers, a former basketball player, and former head coach of the Seattle Storm. She was hired by the Storm on January 20, 2015, but terminated on August 10, 2017 as the team failed to meet the expectations that came along with the acquisition of consecutive top draft picks Jewell Loyd and Breanna Stewart. Boucek was previously the head coach for the Sacramento Monarchs from November 15, 2006 until July 12, 2009.

College career 
Born Jennifer Dawn Boucek in Nashville, Tennessee, Boucek was a four-year starting player for the University of Virginia's women's basketball team  from 1992–96. She helped lead the Cavaliers to four regular season Atlantic Coast Conference (ACC) Championships and three NCAA Elite Eight appearances.

Boucek was a two-time GTE Academic All-American team member and two-time ACC selection. Boucek twice earned team Defensive Player of the Year honors and finished her career at Virginia as a member of the 1,000-point club. She also competed in the U.S. Olympic Festival in 1993.

Boucek graduated with honors in 1997 with a double major degree in sports medicine and sports management. She was given a free fifth year after her college playing career ended. She had six mini-internships during that year, including in sports medicine, sports information and sports psychology. Boucek graduated as No. 1 at Virginia's Curry School of Education and Human Development.

Professional playing career 
Boucek planned to enter med school but rumors of the WNBA's founding had her spending a month getting back into shape to attended a Cleveland Rockers open tryout. In 1997, she was one of a pair of women to earn a spot on the roster from 350 attendees to the tryout.

Despite suffering what would prove to be a career-ending back fracture that season, Boucek signed with Keflavík in the Icelandic Úrvalsdeild in November 1997 . She helped the club win the Icelandic championship and the Icelandic Basketball Cup, and was named the Foreign player of the year. She returned to the Cleveland Rockers in time for the 1998 season but retired from playing due to a career-ending back injury.

Coaching career 
Boucek began her coaching career in the WNBA during the 1999 season as an assistant with the Washington Mystics.  In 2000, she joined the Miami Sol, also as an assistant coach, for three seasons.

In 2003, Boucek joined the Seattle Storm as an assistant coach and in 2004, helped the team win the WNBA Finals Championship, beating the Connecticut Sun.  She also served as one of the Storm's scouts for prospective college players during the NCAA basketball season.

In addition to her official scouting duties, Boucek also served as a color commentator on several Fox Sports Net broadcasts of ACC women's basketball games.

However, shortly after the 2005 WNBA season ended, Boucek declined to remain with the Storm for the upcoming 2006 season, citing personal reasons for her departure.

On November 15, 2006, the Sacramento Monarchs named Boucek as their new head coach for the 2007 WNBA season. On July 12, 2009, Sacramento Monarchs general manager John Whisenant announced the team relieved Boucek of her head coaching duties. She compiled a 40-41 record in two-plus years as Monarchs head coach. She was 19-15 in 2007, 18-16 in 2008, and 3-10 in 2009 at the time of her dismissal.

She regards Pacers coach Rick Carlisle as a friend and mentor with their shared background as standout basketball players at Virginia. He invited Boucek to spend time with his Mavericks staff in 2011 and for a month of 2014's training camp.

On January 20, 2015, the Seattle Storm named Boucek as head coach. On August 10, 2017, the Storm fired Boucek as head coach after compiling a 36-58 record for the franchise and, in particular, for a disappointing 2017 season. 

On October 20, 2017, Boucek was announced as a player development coach for the Sacramento Kings, becoming the third woman assistant coach in NBA history.

On July 19, 2018, Boucek was announced as an assistant coach for the Dallas Mavericks, becoming the first female assistant coach in franchise history. She gave birth to her daughter Rylie twelve days later.

On July 16, 2021, Boucek was named an assistant coach of the Indiana Pacers, remaining with Rick Carlisle, who hired her to join the Mavericks' staff three years earlier.

Coaching record

|-
| align="left" |SAC
| align="left" |2007
|34||19||15|||| align="center" |3rd in West||3||1||2||
| align="center" |Lost in Western Conference Semi-Finals
|-
| align="left" |SAC
| align="left" |2008
|34||18||16|||| align="center" |4th in West||3||1||2||
| align="center" |Lost in Western Conference Semi-Finals
|-
| align="left" |SAC
| align="left" |2009
|13||3||10|||| align="center" |6th in West||-||-||-||-
| align="center" |Fired Mid-Season
|-
| align="left" | SEA
| align="left" |2015
|34||10||24|||| align="center" |5th in West||-||-||-||-
| align="center" |Missed Playoffs
|-
| align="left" | SEA
| align="left" |2016
|34||16||18|||| align="center" |4th in West||1||0||1||
| align="center" |Lost in 1st Round
|-
| align="left" |SEA
| align="left" |2017
|26||10||16|||| align="center" |5th in West||-||-||-||-
| align="center" |Fired Mid-Season
|-class="sortbottom"
| align="left" |Career
| ||175||76||99|||| ||7||2||5||

See also 
 List of female NBA coaches

References

External links
Seattle Storm coaching profile
March 14, 2003 WNBA.com article and interview shortly after she joined the Seattle Storm team
February 27, 2004 WNBA.com article, "Boucek's Choice Pays Off"
September 20, 2005 Seattle Post-Intelligencer article on Boucek leaving the Storm
Sacramento Monarchs press release on being named their head coach
November 15, 2006 Question And Answer session
Jenny Boucek Web Site

1973 births
Living people
American expatriate basketball people in Iceland
American women's basketball coaches
American women's basketball players
Basketball coaches from Tennessee
Basketball players from Nashville, Tennessee
Cleveland Rockers players
Miami Sol coaches
Parade High School All-Americans (girls' basketball)
Point guards
Sacramento Kings assistant coaches
Sacramento Monarchs coaches
Seattle Storm coaches
Sportspeople from Nashville, Tennessee
Undrafted Women's National Basketball Association players
Jenny Boucek
Virginia Cavaliers women's basketball players
Washington Mystics coaches
Jenny Boucek